Urzulei (Orthullè in Sardinian language) is a comune (municipality) in the Province of Nuoro in the Italian region Sardinia, located about  northeast of Cagliari and about  northwest of Tortolì.

The municipality of Urzulei contains the frazione (subdivision) Silana.

Urzulei borders the following municipalities: Baunei, Dorgali, Orgosolo, Talana, Triei.

Demographic evolution

References

External links

 www.comunediurzulei.it
 Urzulei S2K

Cities and towns in Sardinia